Caenopedina diomedeae is a species of sea urchins of the Family Pedinidae. Their armour is covered with spines. Caenopedina diomedeae was first scientifically described in 1939 by Ole Theodor Jensen Mortensen.

References

Animals described in 1939
Pedinoida
Taxa named by Ole Theodor Jensen Mortensen